Telești is a commune in Gorj County, Oltenia, Romania. It is composed of three villages: Buduhala, Șomănești and Telești.

References

Communes in Gorj County
Localities in Oltenia